Blue Creek is a  long tributary of the Owyhee River in the U.S. state of Idaho.

See also
List of rivers of Idaho
List of longest streams of Idaho

References

Rivers of Idaho
Owyhee River
Rivers of Owyhee County, Idaho